Hayden Walsh may refer to:

 Hayden Walsh, Sr. (1963–2010), Antiguan cricketer
 Hayden Walsh, Jr. (born 1992), Antiguan cricketer